Matko Babić (born 28 July 1998) is a Croatian professional footballer who plays as a forward for Liga I club FC Hermannstadt.

Honours
NK Rudeš
2. HNL: 2016–17

References

External links
 

1998 births
Living people
Footballers from Zagreb
Association football defenders
Croatian footballers
Croatia youth international footballers
Croatia under-21 international footballers
NK Lokomotiva Zagreb players
NK Rudeš players
HNK Rijeka players
MFK Karviná players
AEL Limassol players
PAEEK players
FC Hermannstadt players
Croatian Football League players
First Football League (Croatia) players
Cypriot First Division players
Liga I players
Croatian expatriate footballers
Expatriate footballers in the Czech Republic
Croatian expatriate sportspeople in the Czech Republic
Expatriate footballers in Cyprus
Croatian expatriate sportspeople in Cyprus
Expatriate footballers in Romania
Croatian expatriate sportspeople in Romania